Abderrahman Rebbach (born 11 August 1998), commonly known as Abde, is an Algerian professional footballer who plays as a left winger for Spanish club Deportivo Alavés.

Club career
Born in Blida, Abde moved to Vitoria-Gasteiz, Álava, Basque Country at the age of 12. He played for SD Iru-Bat Santa Lucía, CD Ariznabarra and CD Aurrerá de Vitoria as a youth, and made his senior debut with the latter during the 2017–18 season, in Tercera División.

In 2018, Abde joined Deportivo Alavés' affiliate side Club San Ignacio, also in the fourth tier. On 18 August 2020, he was assigned to the reserves in Segunda División B.

On 25 May 2022, after scoring 16 goals for the B-side in the previous campaign, Abde signed a two-year contract and was definitely promoted to the first team in Segunda División. He made his professional debut on 13 August, coming on as a second-half substitute for Xeber Alkain in a 2–1 away win over CD Leganés.

Abde scored his first professional goal on 3 September 2022, netting the opener in a 1–1 home draw against UD Las Palmas.

References

External links

1998 births
Living people
People from Blida
Algerian footballers
Association football wingers
Segunda División players
Segunda División B players
Tercera División players
Tercera Federación players
CD Aurrerá de Vitoria footballers
Deportivo Alavés B players
Deportivo Alavés players
Algerian expatriate footballers
Algerian expatriate sportspeople in Spain
Expatriate footballers in Spain